Mandawar Mahwa Road railway station is a railway station in Dausa district, Rajasthan. Its code is MURD. It serves Mandawar and Mahwa. The station consists of 2 platforms. Passenger, Superfast trains halt here.

References

Railway stations in Dausa district
Agra railway division